Katie Morag (Scottish Gaelic: Ceitidh Morag) is the television adaptation of the series of books by Mairi Hedderwick. The programmes follow the adventures of Katie Morag whose life on the fictional Scottish island of Struay is full of stories of jealousy, bravery and rivalry and peopled by an annoying little brother, busy shopkeeper parents, a perfectly perfect best friend and a couple of grandmothers who between them know everything about everything. The series was produced by Move On Up with support from BBC Scotland and commissioned by the BBC's CBeebies and CBBC channels. It also airs on the BBC's Gaelic channel BBC Alba and BBC One Scotland. Don Coutts directed the series which Margaret Matheson produced and Lindy Cameron executive produced and edited. Katie Morag is also available on BBC iPlayer for over a year.

Series one 
The series was shot on the Isle of Lewis between May and August 2013 at BBC Alba's studios in Stornoway and on location around the island. It comprised 26x15 minute episodes (6 of which were part of a sub-series called Grannie Island's Ceilidh) and began its run on Cbeebies on 3 November 2013.

Some episodes were repeated on BBC One Scotland in a Sunday afternoon slot between April and May 2014.

Series two 
In June 2014, it was announced that Katie Morag would be returning for a second series. Cheryl Taylor, Controller of CBBC, said: "This is the first time that CBBC and CBeebies have co-commissioned a series and I am really pleased to be working so closely with CBeebies. The exclusive episodes to be shown on CBBC will allow us to develop more multifaceted storylines for the older CBBC audience."

Series two was filmed once more on Lewis, between 21 July and 13 September 2014, and comprised 3x15 minute episodes, 9x20 minute episodes and 1x30 minute episode. The first episode was aired on CBBC on 19 December 2014.

Production

Writing 
The  series was scripted by a team comprising Sergio Casci, Stuart Hepburn, Martin McCardie, Jan Storie, and Louise Wylie. They used the method of Team Writing For TV. This ensures that the concepts of theme, tone and narrative coherence are successfully carried across the large number of episodes of a long running TV Series. Crucially,  it requires all writers to be present at all storylining sessions, and for detailed beat outlines to be created by the entire storylining team.

Casting 
Casting for the series included a casting call in Stornoway, Lewis in March 2013. The casting team also held extensive auditions in Glasgow and Edinburgh. The part was eventually won by seven-year-old Cherry Campbell from Glasgow (whose grandmother was born, and still lives, on Lewis). Campbell took part in the Stornoway auditions. Director Don Coutts said, "We were looking for someone with energy, humour and courage to play the feisty wee character of Katie Morag and we think that Cherry has all three of these attributes in spades!"

Locations 

The series is filmed on the Isle of Lewis in the Outer Hebrides. Although the fictional Island of Struay is based on Coll in the Inner Hebrides, the producers felt Lewis had the necessary infrastructure to create the series. Executive producer Lindy Cameron further explained, "It was important to us to try and keep as much of this production in the Highlands as we were able. By making good use of all the innate facilities and skills that Lewis has to offer us we hope that the benefit to the Island, and to all of the Hebrides, will be great."
The locations include the remote village of Tolsta Chaolais (the McColl Shop and Post Office); Tabost, Lochs (Grannie Island's croft); Laxay Boathouse, Laxay (Uncle Matthew's Hut); Cnoc School, Knock; Dal Mor Beach; Bhaltos Pier (Ferry pier, and lady Artists house); Maivaig Pontoon; Shawbost Beach; Reef Beach; Carloway FC (shinty pitch).

Music 
The soundtrack for the series was created by acclaimed Scottish musician, composer and producer Donald Shaw.

The soundtrack was released as an mp3 download on 1 January 2016.

Gaelic 
The series has been dubbed into Scottish Gaelic, for broadcast on BBC Alba. Known as Ceitidh Mòrag, the series began on 7 January 2014.

Cast and characters

Main cast 
Cherry Campbell as Katie Morag McColl
Finlay MacMillan as Liam McColl
Annie Louise Ross as Grannie Island
Gail Watson as Isobel McColl
Kenneth Harvey as Peter McColl
Barbara Rafferty as Grandma Mainland
Angus Peter Campbell as Neilly Beag
Anna Hepburn as Mrs. Baxter

Recurring characters 
Jim Sturgeon as Matthew McColl
Sean Scanlan as Grandad Island
Steven McNicoll as Mr Mackie
Francesca Dymond as Mrs Mackie

Guest actors
Greg Hemphill as Donald John Cameron
Kari Corbett as Candice Kennedy
Cal Macaninch as Mr Cavendish
Shauna Macdonald as Mrs Cavendish
Findlay Napier as Uncle Sven
Hamish Napier as Uncle Sean
Kaitlyn Anne Woodard as Baby Flora Anne McColl

Episodes

Series one
 Katie Morag Delivers the Mail
 Katie Morag and the Two Grandmothers
 Katie Morag and the Old Teacher
 Grannie Island's Ceilidh: The Big Smelly Goat
 Katie Morag and the New Boy
 Katie Morag and the Halloween Pirate
 Katie Morag and Izzy
 Grannie Island's Ceilidh: Stone Soup
 Katie Morag and the Special Delivery
 Katie Morag and the Tiresome Ted
 Katie Morag and the Mysteries
 Grannie Island's Ceilidh: Little Izzy
 Katie Morag and the Two Peas
 Katie Morag and the New Year Party
 Katie Morag and the Baking Day Secret
 Katie Morag and the Grumpy Grannie
 Katie Morag and the Big Boy Cousins
 Grannie Island's Ceilidh: Granpa's Bowl
 Katie Morag and the Seals Singing
 Grannie Island's Ceilidh: Annie Jessie and the Merboy
 Katie Morag and the Hill Race
 Grannie Island's Ceilidh: Hugh Handy
 Katie Morag and the Big Picture
 Katie Morag and the Brochan Bus
 Katie Morag and the Wedding - Part 1
 Katie Morag and the Wedding - Part 2

Series two
 Katie Morag and the Golden Treasure
 Katie Morag and the Family Tree
 Katie Morag and the Dancing Class
 Katie Morag and the Sick Sheep
 Katie Morag and the Carrot Competition
 Katie Morag and the Big Shinty Match
 Katie Morag and the Day of Birthdays
 Katie Morag and the Struay Star
 Katie Morag and the Road to Grannie Island's
 Katie Morag and Uncle Matthew's Hut
 Katie Morag and the Grand Concert
 Katie Morag and the Big Balloon
 Katie Morag and the Worst Day Ever
 Katie Morag and the Doctor
 Katie Morag Goes to the Theatre
 Katie Morag Delivers the Post
 Grannie Island's Ceilidh: The Lost Sheep
 Katie Morag and the Fog
 Katie Morag and the Big Smelly Goat
 Grannie Island's Ceilidh: The Hill Race
 Katie Morag and the Queen

Reception

Critical reception 
The first series was met with widespread critical acclaim. Martin Chilton in The Telegraph wrote, "The series is lovely and celebrates the sense of community so intrinsic to the stories."

In The Times, Helen Rumbelow suggested viewers, "Draw the curtains, pour a whisky and enjoy one of the most realistic child performances of the decade, the butchest grandma on screen, and the best Hebridean landscape in the world. It's as close as you can get to not watching TV without having to give up TV."

Awards 
Katie Morag won two British Academy Children's Awards for 2014: Best Drama, and Best Performance, Cherry Campbell (Katie Morag). 
It was also nominated for Best Writer, Sergio Casci (Lead writer).

The series repeated its 2014 success at the British Academy Children's Awards scooping the award for Best Drama once again in 2015.

Katie Morag won Best Children's Programme at BAFTA Scotland British Academy Scotland Awards in 2014.

The series won Best Children's Programme or Series at the 2014 Freesat Free TV Awards. The judges said, "Beautifully and authentically shot, it was a key move by its host channel into scripted drama, delivering self contained stories that felt sweet and, more importantly, real to their young audience."

It also won the Royal Television Society Scotland Children's Award at the inaugural RTS Scotland awards ceremony in 2014. The judges said, “This programme is innovative and daring in its adaptation of an iconic property. At the heart of it is an exceptional performance from the lead character.”

The series won Best New Kids Series at the 2015 Kidscreen Awards in Miami.

In April 2016 it was announced that Katie Morag had been awarded a prestigious Peabody Award. The American-based Peabody Awards were established in the 1940s as a radio equivalent to the Pulitzer Prize, and have since grown steadily to recognise excellence in a wide range of electronic media. Only around 25 awards are presented each year from over 1,000 global entries, and to win a Peabody, a programme must receive the unanimous approval of all sixteen Peabody Board members. Announcing winners on the award website, members said of the Katie Morag TV series: “Mairi Hedderwick's popular books about a feisty, wee, red-headed girl (the splendid Cherry Campbell) and the Scottish island community she's growing up in are exquisitely realised in this series. Timeless, perhaps old fashioned, but never precious or blindly idyllic, Katie Morag deals honestly and gracefully with death, loss, rivalry and other serious themes.”

DVD releases 
The DVDs of series one were released over the autumn of 2014.

DVD boxsets of series one and series two were subsequently released in 2015.

References

External links 
 

Katie Morag Cbeebies Page
Cbeebies Grown-ups: Katie Morag - Behind the scenes

2010s British children's television series
2013 British television series debuts
2015 British television series endings
Television shows based on children's books
BBC children's television shows
English-language television shows
Television series about children
Television shows set in Scotland
British preschool education television series
2010s preschool education television series
CBeebies
Television series by BBC Studios